Veronica Yoko Plebani (born 1 March 1996) is an Italian Paralympic athlete who has competed in snowboarding, paracanoeing and paratriathlon. She competed at the 2020 Summer Paralympics, in Paratriathlon, Women's PTS2, winning a bronze medal.

Biography
Plebani was born in Gavardo, in the province of Brescia, on 1 March 1996 and residing in Palazzolo sull'Oglio. Since childhood she has practiced numerous sports such as dance, gymnastics, athletics and snowboarding.

On 27 April 2011, Plebani contracted meningitis, which she survived with the loss of the phalanges of the hands and toes. In November 2011, just out of the hospital, she participated in the 5k the day before the New York City Marathon crossing the finish line with 28 runners of the Monza Marathon Team. In the meantime, she became part of the art4sport team, through which she began practicing canoeing and snowboarding. Plebani holds Political Science degree from University of Bologna.

She competed at the 2014 Winter Paralympics, in snowboarding, and at the 2016 Summer Paralympics, in kayaking. In 2017, she started paratriathlon, and competed at the 2017 ITA Paratriathlon National Championships and the 2017 Besancon ITU Paratriathlon World Cup, winning gold medals.

Achievements

References

External links
 

1996 births
Living people
Sportspeople from the Province of Brescia
Italian female snowboarders
Paralympic snowboarders of Italy
Paracanoeists of Italy
Paratriathletes of Italy
Snowboarders at the 2014 Winter Paralympics
Paracanoeists at the 2016 Summer Paralympics
Paratriathletes at the 2020 Summer Paralympics
Medalists at the 2020 Summer Paralympics
Paralympic bronze medalists for Italy
21st-century Italian women